Waccamaw Siouan Indians are one of eight state-recognized tribes in North Carolina. They are also known as the "People of the Fallen Star." Historically Siouan-speaking, they are located predominantly in the southeastern North Carolina counties of Bladen and Columbus. Their congressional representative introduced a failed bill for federal recognition in 1948. North Carolina recognized the group in 1971.

The Waccamaw Siouan Indians are considered to be Waccamaw, as are the Waccamaw Indian People, a state-recognized tribe from South Carolina. However, the two are not affiliated with each other. The Waccamaw Siouan Indians also hold no affiliation with the Waccamaw Siouxan of Farmers Union, North Carolina.

Their communities are St. James, Buckhead, and Council, with the Waccamaw Siouan tribal homeland situated on the edge of Green Swamp about 37 miles from Wilmington, North Carolina, seven miles from Lake Waccamaw, and four miles north of Bolton, North Carolina. The names of major families include: Patrick, Jacobs, Freeman, Graham, Blanks, Young, Baldwin, Spaulding, Campbell, and Moore.

Demographics
According to the 2010 Census, the total Waccamaw Siouan population in Columbus and Bladen counties was 1,896 (1,025 and 331, respectively). This represents 2.7% of the total combined Native American population of North Carolina. Current tribal enrollment consists of 2,594 members.

Between 1980 and 2000, the two-county area experienced a small overall population increase of 6.7% compared with a 37% rate of growth for North Carolina. The growth in the two counties was mostly among the Native American and Hispanic populations—61% and 295%, respectively, the latter also representing immigration. There was a 7% increase in the black population, and a 0.6% decrease in the white population.

Government
The tribe is governed by the Waccamaw Siouan Tribal Council, Inc., consisting of six members who are elected by the tribal membership, with staggered terms of one to three years. The Tribal Chief's position, formerly inherited or handed down in personal appointment, is now also an elected position. The tribe has an Elders Review Committee, which conducts monthly tribal meetings to inform and educate members about issues of importance to the tribe as a whole. The opinions and suggestions of tribal members are solicited during these meetings and are incorporated into the decision-making process.

The tribal council employs a tribal administrator to handle the day-to-day operations of the tribe, with an annual budget of approximately $1 million. The administrator supervises the management of tribal grant programs and provides a monthly reporting of the status of grant activities to local, state, and federal agencies, private donors, the tribal council, and tribal members.

State and federal recognition
The Waccamaw Siouan Indians were recognized by the state of North Carolina in 1971, and holds membership on the NC Commission of Indian Affairs as per NCGS 143B-407. The Tribe was incorporated as a 501(c)(3) organization in 1977. Lumbee Legal Services, Inc., represents the Waccamaw Siouan Tribe in its administrative process for seeking federal recognition.

Location
The current tribal homeland is on the edge of Green Swamp, seven miles from Lake Waccamaw. Many stories are associated with the origins of Lake Waccamaw. According to the tribe, an immense meteor appeared in the sky coming from  the southwest many thousands of years ago. When the meteor struck, it burned itself deep into the earth. The water from the nearby rivers and swamps flowed into the lake.

Language
The earliest Europeans in the Carolinas were astounded by the linguistic diversity of what is now the Southeastern United States. Within the region now known as North Carolina, three language families were represented, as distinct from one another as Indo-European languages are from Uralic languages: 
The Hatteras, Chowan, Moratok, Pamlico, Secotan, Machapunga, and the Weapemeoc of the coastal plain spoke a variety of Algonquian languages. 
The Cherokee, Tuscarora, Coree, and Meherrin, who inhabited homelands from the coastal plain to the Appalachian Mountains, spoke a variety of Iroquoian languages.  
The Catawba, Cheraw, Cape Fear, Eno, Keyauwee, Occaneechi, Tutelo, Saponi, Shakori, Sissipahaw, Sugeree, Wateree, Waxhaw, and Waccamaw of the Cape Fear River and Piedmont regions, were related Siouan-speaking peoples.

The ancestral Siouan Woccon language of the Waccamaw Siouan Indians of North Carolina was lost due to devastating population losses and social disruption of the 18th and 19th centuries. It survives as a handful of vocabulary recorded in the early 1700s.

History

Legend of Lake Waccamaw
Since its earliest recorded exploration in 1735 by the naturalist William Bartram, (who was assisted in his efforts by the Waccamaw), Lake Waccamaw has been the subject of many stories describing its legendary origin. Early European settlers adapted folk tales.

According to the Waccamaw Siouan Indians, thousands of years ago, an immense meteor appeared in the night sky toward the southwest. Flaming to a brilliance of suns as it hurtled earthward, the meteor finally struck, burning deep within the earth. The waters of the surrounding swamps and rivers flowed into the crater and cooled it, creating the gem-blue, verdant green lake. Some historians contend that this story is the mid-20th century invention of James E. Alexander.

16th century
Archeologist Martin T. Smith suggests that the 1521 Spanish expedition led by Francisco Girebillo likely encountered a Waccamaw village when they traveled inland from the Carolina coast along the Waccamaw and Pee Dee rivers.  Describing the inhabitants of the river valley as semi-nomadic, Girebillo noted that they relied on hunting and gathering, and limited agriculture.  He wrote that the people practiced mortuary customs "peculiar" to them, but failed to describe their distinctive practices in any detail.

Francisco Gordillo and Pedro de Quexos captured and enslaved several Native Americans in 1521, and shipped them to Hispaniola, which the Spanish were colonizing. One of the men became known as Francisco de Chicora. Francisco identified more than twenty indigenous peoples who lived in the territory of present-day South Carolina, among which he mentioned the "Chicora" and the "Duhare," whose tribal territories comprised the northernmost regions. Anthropologist John R. Swanton believed that these nations included the Waccamaw and the Cape Fear Indians. Lucas Vázquez de Ayllón returned to the area in 1526.

17th century
About 150 years later, the Englishman William Hilton recorded his encounter with ancestors of the Waccamaw Siouan people, calling them the Woccon. In 1670, the German surveyor and physician John Lederer mentioned them in his Discoveries.  By the beginning of the 17th century, the Woccon (Waccamaw), along with a number of Pee Dee River tribes, had been pushed north by a combination of Spanish and allied Cusabo Indian forces.  Some of the earliest English travelers to the interior of the Carolinas, John Lederer in 1670 and John Lawson some thirty years later, referred to the Waccamaw in their travel narratives as an Eastern Siouan people.  They were repeating information from others; neither visited the area of wetlands where some of the Waccamaw were beginning to seek refuge from colonial incursions.

18th century
John Lawson had placed the Woccon a few miles to the south of the Tuscarora in his New Voyage to Carolina (1700). Settling around the confluence of the Waccamaw and Pee Dee rivers, this amalgam of tribes had fragmented by 1705; a group of Woccon who moved farther north to the Lower Neuse River and Contentnea Creek.  The first written mention of the Woccon (or Waccamaw) by English colonials was recorded in 1712.  The South Carolina Colony tried to persuade the Waccamaw, along with the Cape Fear Indians, to join James Moore, son of the former British colonial governor of South Carolina, in his expedition against the Tuscarora in the Tuscarora War.

British colonial administrators began to refer to the Woccon who moved south as the Waccamaw, as they settled near the Waccamaw River. Each colonial group tried to transliterate the names of tribes and spelling varied greatly. Waccamaw, for example, appeared in the historical record at about the same time that "Woccon" disappeared.

The Waccamaw continued to inhabit the region along the Waccamaw and Pee Dee rivers until 1718, when they relocated to the Weenee, or Black River area. In 1720, they joined with fleeing families of Tuscarora, Cheraw, Keyauwee, and Hatteras Indians along Drowning Creek, now known as the Lumbee, or Lumber River.  Families of Waccamaw Indians continued to live along Drowning Creek until 1733, when some families sought refuge along Lake Waccamaw and Green Swamp.

By the second decade of the 18th century, many Waccamaw, also known as the Waccommassus, were located one hundred miles northeast of Charleston, South Carolina. In 1749, a war broke out between the Waccamaw and South Carolina Colony.

After the Waccamaw-South Carolina War, the Waccamaw sought refuge in the wetland region situated on the edge of Green Swamp, near Lake Waccamaw.  They settled four miles north of present-day Bolton, North Carolina, along what is still known as the "Old Indian Trail." State land deeds and other colonial records substantiate the oral traditions of the Waccamaw Siouan Indians and their claim to the Green Swamp region.

19th century
Given their three-century-long historical experience of European contact, the Waccamaw Siouan Indians had become highly acculturated. They depended on European-style agriculture and established claims to land through individual farmsteads.

In 1835, following Nat Turner's slave rebellion, North Carolina passed laws restricting the rights and movements of free blacks, who had previously been allowed to vote.  Because Native Americans were classified equally as "Free people of color" and many were of mixed-race, the Waccamaw Siouan Indians and others were stripped of their political and civil rights.  They could no longer vote, bear arms, or serve in the state militia.

Local whites intensified harassment of the Waccamaw Siouan Indians after North Carolina ratified this  discriminatory state constitution. Whites tended to classify them simply as black, rather than recognizing their cultural identification as Indian.

Education 
Through much of the 19th century, Waccamaw Siouan children received no public school education. None existed in the South before the American Civil War. During Reconstruction, Republican-dominated legislatures established public schools, but legislators had to agree to racially segregated facilities to get them passed. Having been free people before the war, the Waccamaw Siouan did not want to enroll their children in school with the children of freedmen. The public schools had only two classifications: white and all other (black and mulatto, the term for mixed-race or "people of color," usually referring to people of African and European ancestry, the most common mixture).

Late in the 19th century, the Croatan Indians of Robeson County (now called Lumbee Tribe of North Carolina) gained state-recognition as tribes and support for a separate school.  The Croatan Indians of Samson County, now called the Coharie Intra-tribal Council, Inc. built their own schools and later still, developed their own school system. The Waccamaw-Siouan Tribe followed suit by founding the Doe Head School in 1885. Situated in the Buckhead Indian community, the school was open only sporadically. It closed in 1921, after the state had sent a black teacher to the school, and the community asked the teacher to leave.

20th century
The first county-supported Indian school open to Waccamaw Siouans was called the "Wide Awake School." The school was built in 1933 in the Buckhead community in Bladen County. Classes were taught by Welton Lowry (Lumbee).  Waccamaw Siouan students who wanted to attend high school among self-identified Indians went to the Coharie Intra-tribal Council's community's East Carolina High School in Clinton, North Carolina; the Lumbee Fairmont High School in Fairmont, Robeson County; or the Catawba Indian School in South Carolina.

The Waccamaw Siouan Indians received state recognition in 1971 and organized as a nonprofit group, which forms its elected government. They are working on documentation to gain federal recognition.

The Waccamaw Siouan Indian Tribe Powwow
The Waccamaw Siouan hold an annual powwow, an annual cultural celebration held on the third Friday and Saturday of October  at the Waccamaw Siouan Tribal Grounds in the Buckhead Community of Bolton, North Carolina.  Open to the public, the Powwow has a traditional dance competition, drumming competition, horse show, and gospel singing  A crafts fair features items made by members of the Waccamaw tribe, and demonstrations of the associated craft skills.  The Waccamaw Siouan 44th Annual Powwow was held from October 17–18, 2014 and had an attendance of approximately 2,500.

Relationship to other North Carolina Indian Tribes
Like most North Carolina Indian groups, the Waccamaw Siouan Indians have a long tradition of affiliation with other tribal nations. Kinship practices first observed in the colonial era continue through intermarriage with other tribes.

Particular surnames are common among three tribes, the Waccamaw Siouan, Coharie, and Lumbee: Campbell, Baldwin, Freeman, Jacobs, Patrick, Graham, Hammonds, Blanks, Hunt, Locklear, Moore, Strickland, Young, Bowen, Godwin, Lacewell, Bryant, Daniels, and Spaulding. Several of these names are also common among white and African-American families in the area. For instance, there are many African-American descendants of Benjamin and Edith Spaulding of Bladen County, North Carolina. Edith was known to be Native American.

Notes

External links 
 Waccamaw Siouan Indians, official website

Native American tribes in North Carolina
Native American history of North Carolina
Bladen County, North Carolina
Columbus County, North Carolina
Extinct languages of North America
Siouan peoples
State-recognized tribes in the United States